Lady Bohwa of the Gaeseong Wang clan was a Goryeo Royal Princess as the fourth child and second daughter of King Gwangjong and Queen Daemok. There was no detailed records about her life.

References

Goryeo princesses
10th-century Korean people
Year of birth unknown
Year of death unknown